Alliance of the Centre may refer to:

 Alliance of the Centre (Italy), Italian political party founded in 2008
 Alliance of the Centre (Switzerland), Swiss political party founded in 2021